Futur is French for Future

It may also refer to:

FUTUR, a Nigerian Clothier brand

French grammar
Futur proche
Futur simple

Persons
Woldai Futur, politician and minister in Eritrea

Music
Futur (album), 2012 album of Booba
Futur 2.0, 2013 album of Booba
Futur 80, cancelled album of French singer Leslie

See also
FUTUR
Future
Avion de Transport Supersonique Futur